Nepalkanchia is a genus of harvestmen in the family Sclerosomatidae from Nepal.

Species
 Nepalkanchia pluviosilvestris (J. Martens, 1987)
 Nepalkanchia silvicola (J. Martens, 1987)

References

Harvestmen
Harvestman genera